Roger Naviaux (1926 – 26 March 2016) was a French entomologist known for his work on beetles.

He described numerous species of beetle. Neocollyris naviauxi, and Paraphysodeutera naviauxi, both in the family Carabidae, are named after him.

Publications

References 

1926 births
2016 deaths
Place of birth missing
Coleopterists